Romulus Vereș (Cluj, January 23, 1929 – Ștei, December 13, 1993) was a notorious serial killer from Romania, better known as "The Man with the Hammer".

During the 1970s, he was charged with five murders and several attempted murders, but never imprisoned on grounds of insanity; he had schizophrenia, blaming the Devil for his actions. Instead, he was institutionalised in the Ștei psychiatric facility in 1976, following a three-year-long forensic investigation during which four thousand people were questioned.

Urban myths brought the number of victims up to 200 women, but the actual number was much smaller. This confusion probably is explained by the lack of attention this case received, despite its magnitude, in the Communist press of the time.

See also
List of serial killers by country

Notes

1929 births
1993 deaths
20th-century criminals
Male serial killers
People from Cluj-Napoca
People with schizophrenia
Romanian rapists
Romanian serial killers
Violence against women in Romania